Mohammad Shukri bin Mohamed Sahar (born 20 March 1986) or better known as Shuk Sahar is a Malaysian comedian, host and actor. He was a participant in Raja Lawak Season 5 in the group Balas in 2011. He teamed up with Fendi in the group.

Early life 
Shuk joined the Raja Lawak comedy television show season 5 with his good friend, Fendi through the Balas group. The Balas group is often criticized for presenting pornographic jokes week after week.  On the night of the final stage the Balas group lost at the hands of Man.

On 20 December 2015, Syuk successfully held his wedding ceremony with the girl of his choice Rossalennah Natassyiah Asshaferah or Sera (23 years old) in Kampung Ulu Sapi, Beluran Sandakan, Sabah.

On 30 October 2016, Shuk's wife gave birth to their daughter named Nur Qurratu Ain (read) at 10.05 pm at Putra Medical Center, Sungai Buloh.

Filmography

Film

Dramas

Telefilms

Television

Radiography

Radio

References

External links 
 

Malaysian film actors
Malaysian television actors
Malaysian Muslims
Malaysian people of Malay descent
21st-century Malaysian male actors
Malaysian television presenters
Malaysian male actors
Malaysian comedians
People from Penang
Living people
1986 births